Tom Poitras is an American soccer coach and is currently the head men's soccer coach at Northern Kentucky University, a position he's held since 2022.

Playing career
Poitras played collegiate soccer at Southern Connecticut State University. During the 1987 season he was part of the division II national championship team.

Coaching career

New Haven
From 1994 to 1997, he coached at the University of New Haven where he compiled a 38–32–5 record.

Southern New Hampshire
From 1998 to 2003, he served as the head men's soccer coach at Southern New Hampshire University where he posted an 81–25–16 record. His team advanced to four NCAA tournaments, and compiled five 10 win seasons.

UW Green Bay
His 2009 squad went 14–3–3, and reached the NCAA tournament for the first time in 26 years. During the season, UW-Greenbay had impressive victories against Wisconsin, DePaul, and Butler. The team finished undefeated at home with a 7–0–1 record for the first time in 26 years, and a second place overall finish in the Horizon League. In 2007, his team beat NCAA runner-up Ohio State University in a major upset.

Hartford
He was hired as head coach at Hartford in April 2011. In 2014 Poitras signed a 5 year contract extension with Hartford. Poitras was inducted into the Connecticut Soccer Hall of Fame in 2017.

Northern Kentucky
He was hired as the 5th head coach in the history of Northern Kentucky's men's soccer program in January 2022.

Head coaching record

†NCAA canceled 2020 collegiate activities due to the COVID-19 virus.

References

External links
 Official Biography, Hartford Hawks

Green Bay Phoenix men's soccer coaches
Living people
1968 births
People from Southington, Connecticut
Soccer players from Connecticut
Southern Connecticut Fighting Owls men's soccer players
Hartford Hawks men's soccer coaches
Southern New Hampshire Penmen men's soccer coaches
Association football midfielders
American soccer coaches
Association football players not categorized by nationality
Northern Kentucky Norse men's soccer coaches